The 1912 Tennessee gubernatorial election was held on November 5, 1912. Incumbent Republican Ben W. Hooper defeated Democratic nominee Benton McMillin with 50.10% of the vote.

General election

Candidates
Ben W. Hooper, Republican
Benton McMillin, Democratic

Results

References

1912
Tennessee
Gubernatorial